Laheküla is a village in Saaremaa Parish, Saare County in western Estonia.

Suurlaht, the eastern part of Estonian fourth largest lake Mullutu-Suurlaht is located in the southwestern part of Laheküla village.

Before the administrative reform in 2017, the village was in Lääne-Saare Parish.

See also
Suurlaht
Linnulaht

References

Villages in Saare County